Tulsi Ghimire is an Indian film director, screenwriter, film editor, cameraman, actor and lyricist known for his works in Nepali films. Regarded as one of the greatest filmmakers of Nepali cinema, he is known for his romantic and masala film that dealt with social issues of Nepali society, portrayal of deep human emotions and masala films. He has directed some of the iconic Nepali films like Kusume Rumal, Deuta, Laure, Chino, Dakshina, Balidan and Darpan Chaya. Majority of his movies in 1990s were blockbusters and two of the movies Kusume Rumal and Darpan Chaya went on to become the highest grossing Nepali film of all time.

Personal life
Tulsi Ghimire was born in Sindeybong, Kalimpong, Darjeeling district, India to Nepali parents Dhojman Ghimire and Narbada Ghimire. He has two younger brothers and a sister.

Ghimire studied at the Mani Memorial Primary School in Sindeybong up to second grade, and then from grade 3 to 11 at the Scottish University Mission Institute (SUMI), Kalimpong. He obtained a Bachelor of Arts degree from Kalimpong College.

He is married to Bharati Ghimire (Gazmer), who has sung in many of his films. His brother Shrawan Ghimire is a film producer. Tulsi's children, Bhawana Ghimire and Panchami Ghimire, appeared in a Nepali children's film, Swarg Ko Pari.

Films
In addition to being a film director, Tulsi Ghimire has also been a screenwriter, editor, cameraman, actor and lyricist.
 
Ghimire initially moved to Mumbai from Kalimpong in 1974 to work in the Indian film industry, Bollywood. His mentor and Bollywood editor Kamlakar Karkhanis advised him to make Nepali movies at that time. Ghimire debuted in the Nepali film industry with the Nepali movie Bansuri in 1981 as a director. He made his second movie Kusume Rumal in 1985, based on his own story, which became very successful.

Among his movies, Kusume Rumal, Lahure, Deuta, Chino, Balidaan, Dakshina and Darpan Chhaya are considered hits. Darpan Chaya is considered to be one of the biggest blockbusters of Nepali cinema.

Although he found lot of success in 1980s, 1990s, and early 2000s, he was unable to comeback with another hit. He was unable to find success with films he directed later on in his life, those films include Drishtikon, Mrigatrishna, and Darpan Chhaya 2 which were all considered flop in box office.

Filmography

Awards

See also
Cinema of Nepal

References

External links
 

1951 births
Living people
Indian film directors
People from Kalimpong district
Indian male writers
Nepali-language writers
Indian screenwriters
Nepali-language lyricists
Indian Gorkhas
Khas people
Nepali-language singers from India
Nepali-language writers from India